Ricardo José Silva Varela (born September 5, 1989) is a Portuguese swimmer from Clube Naval Setubalense. He has practised swimming since he was three years old, and has been a professional swimmer for about 11 years. Varela started to swim, until the age of 8 in Clube Fluvial Vilacondense, in Vila do Conde. Since then he represents the CNS, becoming national champion, record holder and be a part of the National Team. His best stroke is breaststroke, in the distances of 50,100 and 200 meters, and right now is a senior. He's trained by Pedro Vale (Head Coach).

Career highlights

2002-2003
Twice South Portugal Champion
Best swimmer at Vale do Tejo Cup
Gold Medal at TAP Meeting Internacional
Three gold medals and one silver medal at the Region Championships
Six Region relay titles
National Champion and Silver medal at the National Championship

2003-2004
Silver Medal at Estoril Meeting Internacional
Five Gold medals and two Silver medals at the Region Championships
One Gold, one Silver medal, and two bronze medals at the National Championships
Gold Medal at TAP Meeting Internacional
Bronze Medal in relay in the National Championships
Three Gold medals and two Silver Medals in relay at the Region Championships

2004-2005
In the National Team twice: Multinations Youth and European Youth Olympic Festival
Bronze medal at Multinations Youth
Silver Medal at Estoril Meeting Internacional
Gold Medal at TAP Meeting Internacional
Three gold medals and silver medal at the National Championships
Two gold medals at the Region Championships
Two gold medal and two silver medals in relay at the National Championships
Gold Medal in relay at the Region Championships

2005-2006
Three bronze medals at the Junior National Championships
(Outdated)

2006-2007
Three Gold Medals at the Junior National Championships
Gold Medal at Multinations Junior
Tenth place and tenth second place at the European Junior Championships
Two Silver Medals and one bronze Medal at the Summer National Championships

2007-2008
Second best team at the National Clubs Championship
Fourth best performance at 100 meters breaststroke in the 25 meter's pool
Bronze Medal at the Winter National Championships
Two silver medals at Loulé International Meeting
One Silver Medal and two bronze Medals at the Summer National Championships

2008-2009
National Champion and bronze medal at the Short Course Portuguese National Championships
Seventh, Eighth and Twelfth place at the 11th Luxembourg EuroMeet
Two Silver Medals at the 3rd Póvoa de Varzim Internacional Meeting
Eleven place at the Spanish Open Championships

Abstract
South Portugal Championships: Two Gold Medals
Region Championships: Ten Gold Medals, Three Silver Medals (Outdated)
National Championships: Nine Gold Medals, Nine Silver Medals, Ten Bronze Medals
Best swimmer at Vale do Tejo Cup in 2003
Three Consecutive Gold Titles at TAP International Meeting
Six times in the National Team
Bronze Medal at Multinations Youth
Gold Medal and Silver Medal in the Multinations Junior
Tenth place and tenth second place at the European Junior Championships

Best Performances

25 Meters Pool

50 Meters Pool

Portuguese National Records

50 Meters Pool

(Outdated)

National Team Athlete

Mutinations Youth Meet - Madeira, Madeira
European Youth Olympic Festival - Lignano Sabbiadoro, Italy
Multinations Junior Meet - Genève Swiss
European Junior Championships - Antwerp, Belgium
11th Luxembourg Euro-Meet - Luxembourg, Luxembourg
Spanish Open Championships - Málaga, Spain

Open Water

 World Cup (Setúbal) - 10 km
 Setúbal Open Water - 2,6 km
 Sesimbra Open Water - 1,5 km
 Sines Open Water - 1,5 km
 Castelo de Bode Open Water - 10 km

Academic life

Academic History

 College Coração de Jesus - Póvoa de Varzim (1992–1998) - (Nursery to 3rd class)
 Areias Primary School - Setúbal (1998–1999) - (4th class)
 Aranguês School - Setúbal (1998–2001) - (5th and 6th class)
 Sebastião da Gama High School (2001–2007) - (7th to 12th class)
 Universidade Técnica de Lisboa - Instituto Superior Técnico (2007–2008) - Mechanical Engineering Course
 Instituto Politécnico de Setúbal - Escola Superior de Tecnologia (2008–2012) - Mechanical Engineering Course

References

External links
 Clube Naval Setubalense
 Federação Portuguesa de Natação
 Blog Beba Água

Portuguese male swimmers
Living people
1989 births
People from Póvoa de Varzim
Technical University of Lisbon alumni
Sportspeople from Porto District